Paul Collins (September 28, 1922 – July 16, 2012) was an American football quarterback who played in the National Football League.

College career
Collins attended the University of Missouri and was a member of the basketball, football, and track teams. As a senior, Collins led the Tigers with ten touchdowns scored and was named first team All-Big Six Conference.

Professional career
Collins was drafted in the second round of the 1945 NFL Draft by the Chicago Cardinals. He played one season with the team, playing in three games with one start. and completing three of 17 passes for 43 yards with two interceptions. Collins lone start was a 10–0 loss on September 23, 1945, to the Detroit Lions.

Post football
After the end of his football career Collins worked as an account executive for Purina and Dow Chemical and was a real estate agent for Caldwell Banker. Collins died on July 16, 2012, in Royal Oak, Michigan.

References

1922 births
2012 deaths
Players of American football from Missouri
American football quarterbacks
Missouri Tigers football players
Chicago Cardinals players
Missouri Tigers men's basketball players